The Philippine House Committee on Micro, Small and Medium Enterprise Development, or House Micro, Small and Medium Enterprise Development Committee is a standing committee of the Philippine House of Representatives.

Jurisdiction 
As prescribed by House Rules, the committee's jurisdiction is on the policies and programs on entrepreneurship development which includes the promotion of the following:
 Entrepreneurship
 Establishment and continuing viability and growth of small and medium-scale enterprises
 Support to entrepreneurs

Members, 18th Congress

See also
 House of Representatives of the Philippines
 List of Philippine House of Representatives committees

References

External links 
House of Representatives of the Philippines

Micro